"If You Don't Someone Else Will" is a song written by "Country" Johnny Mathis, sung by Jimmy & Johnny, and released on the Chess label (catalog no. 4859). In September 1954, it peaked at No. 3 on the Billboard country and western juke box chart. It was also ranked No. 22 on Billboards 1954 year-end country and western retail chart.

See also
 Billboard Top Country & Western Records of 1954

References

American country music songs
1954 songs
Songs written by "Country" Johnny Mathis